Salvador Edward Luria (August 13, 1912 – February 6, 1991) was an Italian microbiologist, later a naturalized U.S. citizen. He won the Nobel Prize in Physiology or Medicine in 1969, with Max Delbrück and Alfred Hershey, for their discoveries on the replication mechanism and the genetic structure of viruses. Salvador Luria also showed that bacterial resistance to viruses (phages) is genetically inherited.

Biography

Early life 
Luria was born Salvatore Luria in Turin, Italy to an influential Italian Sephardi Jewish family. His parents were Davide and Ester (Sacerdote) Luria. He attended the medical school at the  University of Turin studying with Giuseppe Levi. There, he met two other future Nobel laureates: Rita Levi-Montalcini and Renato Dulbecco. He graduated from the University of Turin in 1935 and never got a master's degree or a PhD as they were not contemplated by the Italian high educational system (which, on the other hand, was very selective). From 1936 to 1937, Luria served his required time in the Italian army as a medical officer. He then took classes in radiology at the University of Rome. Here, he was introduced to Max Delbrück's theories on the gene as a molecule and began to formulate methods for testing genetic theory with the bacteriophages, viruses that infect bacteria.

In 1938, he received a fellowship to study in the United States, where he intended to work with Delbrück. Soon after Luria received the award, Benito Mussolini's fascist regime banned Jews from academic research fellowships. Without funding sources for work in the U.S. or Italy, Luria left his home country for Paris, France in 1938. As the Nazi German armies invaded France in 1940, Luria fled on bicycle to Marseille where he received an immigration visa to the United States.

Phage research 

Luria arrived in New York City on September 12, 1940, and soon changed his first and middle names. With the help of physicist Enrico Fermi, whom he knew from his time at the University of Rome, Luria received a Rockefeller Foundation fellowship at Columbia University. He soon met Delbrück and Hershey, and they collaborated on experiments at Cold Spring Harbor Laboratory and in Delbrück's lab at Vanderbilt University.

His famous experiment with Delbrück in 1943, known as the Luria–Delbrück experiment, demonstrated statistically that inheritance in bacteria must follow Darwinian rather than Lamarckian principles and that mutant bacteria occurring randomly can still bestow viral resistance without the virus being present. The idea that natural selection affects bacteria has profound consequences, for example, it explains how bacteria develop antibiotic resistance.

From 1943 to 1950, he worked at Indiana University. His first graduate student was James D. Watson, who went on to discover the structure of DNA with Francis Crick. In January 1947, Luria became a naturalized citizen of the United States.

In 1950, Luria moved to the University of Illinois at Urbana–Champaign. In the early 1950s, Luria and Giuseppe Bertani discovered the phenomenon of host-controlled restriction and modification of a bacterial virus: a culture of E. coli can significantly reduce the production of phages grown in other strains; however, once the phage become established in that strain, they also become  restricted in their ability to grow in other strains.  It was later discovered by other researchers that bacteria produce enzymes that cut viral DNA at particular sequences but not the bacteria's own DNA, which is protected by methylation.  These enzymes became known as restriction enzymes and developed into one of the main molecular tools in molecular biology.

Luria won the Nobel Prize in Physiology or Medicine in 1969, with Max Delbrück and Alfred Hershey, for their discoveries on the replication mechanism and the genetic structure of viruses.

Later work 
In 1959, he became chair of Microbiology at the Massachusetts Institute of Technology (MIT). At MIT, he switched his research focus from phages to cell membranes and bacteriocins. While on sabbatical in 1963 to study at the Institut Pasteur in Paris, he found that bacteriocins impair the function of cell membranes. Returning to MIT, his lab discovered that bacteriocins achieve this impairment by forming holes in the cell membrane, allowing ions to flow through and destroy the electrochemical gradient of cells. In 1972, he became chair of The Center for Cancer Research at MIT.  The department he established included future Nobel Prize winners David Baltimore, Susumu Tonegawa, Phillip Allen Sharp and H. Robert Horvitz.

In addition to the Nobel Prize, Luria received a number of awards and recognitions. He was elected to the American Academy of Arts and Sciences in 1959. He was named a member of the National Academy of Sciences in 1960. In 1964, he was elected to the American Philosophical Society. From 1968 to 1969, he served as president of the American Society for Microbiology. In 1969, he was awarded the Louisa Gross Horwitz Prize from Columbia University together with Max Delbrück, co-winner with Luria of the Nobel Prize in Physiology or Medicine in 1969. In the U.S. he won the 1974 National Book Award in Science for his popular science book Life: the Unfinished Experiment
and received the National Medal of Science in 1991.

Political activism 
Throughout his career, Luria was an outspoken political advocate. He joined with Linus Pauling in 1957 to protest against nuclear weapon testing.  Luria was an opponent of the Vietnam War and a supporter of organized labor. In the 1970s, he was involved in debates over genetic engineering, advocating a compromise position of moderate oversight and regulation rather than the extremes of a complete ban or full scientific freedom. Due to his political involvement, he was blacklisted from receiving funding from the National Institutes of Health for a short time in 1969.

He was a friend of the noted linguist and political activist Noam Chomsky, and communicated with the Jewish American writer Elie Wiesel through a letter, in which he criticized Israel's involvement in the Guatemalan genocide and satirically Wiesel's silence on any issue concerning Israel's alleged terrorist activities worldwide. Chomsky would later describe it as such: "In the mid-1980s, Salvador Luria, a friend of mine who is a Nobel laureate in biology and politically active, knew about this [i.e., the genocide]. It wasn't a big secret. He asked me to collect articles from the Hebrew press which described Israel's participation in genocidal attacks in Guatemala – not just participation, it's a leadership role – because he wanted to send it to Elie Wiesel with a polite letter saying: as a fellow Nobel laureate, I would like to bring this to your attention. Could you use your influence – he didn't ask him to say anything, that's too much, but privately could you communicate to the people you know well at a high level in Israel and say it's not nice to take part in genocide. He never got a response."

Death 
Luria died in Lexington, Massachusetts of a heart attack on 6 February, 1991 at the age of 78.

See also
 List of Jewish Nobel laureates
 Phage group
 Luria–Delbrück experiment

References

External links
 The Official Site of Louisa Gross Horwitz Prize
 The Salvador E. Luria Papers - Profiles in Science, National Library of Medicine
 

1912 births
1991 deaths
Nobel laureates in Physiology or Medicine
Italian Nobel laureates
Italian Sephardi Jews
American Nobel laureates
American people of Italian-Jewish descent
American Sephardic Jews
American tax resisters
Columbia University faculty
History of genetics
Indiana University faculty
Italian emigrants to the United States
20th-century Italian Jews
Italian microbiologists
Jewish microbiologists
Jewish American scientists
Massachusetts Institute of Technology School of Science faculty
National Book Award winners
National Medal of Science laureates
Physicians from Turin
Phage workers
20th-century Sephardi Jews
University of Illinois Urbana-Champaign faculty
University of Turin alumni
Members of the United States National Academy of Sciences
Naturalized citizens of the United States
Italian exiles
Scientists from Turin
Members of the National Academy of Medicine
Members of the American Philosophical Society